Canoe Lake is a lake in Timiskaming District, Ontario, Canada, about  north of Matachewan and  west of Kirkland Lake. The lake is part of the Montreal River drainage basin, and hence part of the Ottawa River drainage basin.

References

Lakes of Timiskaming District